Nottingham Business School is a full-service business school located in Nottingham, England. Formed in 1980, it is a part of Nottingham Trent University and in 2010 the school opened the regenerated Newton and Arkwright project. The redevelopment transformed two of the University’s flagship buildings (which are both Grade II listed) into an ultra-modern complex, linked together by a glazed link building. Business School  abbreviated to NBS) is located in the Newton Building. The school offers qualifications ranging from undergraduate bachelor's degrees through to postgraduate, master's and doctorate degrees. Nottingham Business School is located in the City Centre Campus.

Professor Baback Yazdani is the dean and watches over the five academic divisions:
Accounting and Finance
Economics
Human Resource Management
Management
Marketing

Courses
The university offers a variety of courses in business, management and marketing at various levels.
Undergraduate
Postgraduate
Professional
Masters in Business Administration (MBA)
Research (PhD)
Doctoral (DBA)

Accreditations and rankings
The Nottingham Business School has received accreditations from professional bodies such as the Association of Chartered Certified Accountants (ACCA), CFA Society of the UK, Chartered Institute of Marketing (CIM), The Chartered Institute of Management Accountants (CIMA), The Chartered Institute of Personnel and Development accreditation (CIPD), Chartered Institute of Public Finance (CIPFA), Chartered Management Institute (CMI), EPAS, EdUniversal 2013 (3 Palmes), Institute of Chartered Accountants in England and Wales (ICAEW) and QS Stars.

NBS is accredited by EQUIS and AACSB putting it in the ranks of the top 1% of business schools in the world. It is only one of 19 business schools in the UK to hold both accreditations.

Nottingham Business School was ranked 95th in the Financial Times' list of top European Business Schools in 2017  and 93rd in the world Masters in Management list.

References

Nottingham Trent University